The Chickahominy Formation is a geologic formation in Virginia. It preserves fossils dating back to the Paleogene period.

See also

 List of fossiliferous stratigraphic units in Virginia
 Paleontology in Virginia

References
 

Paleogene geology of Virginia